Saint-Jean-Poutge (Gascon: Sent Joan Potge) is a commune in the Gers department in southwestern France.

Geography

Population

Monuments
 Château de Herrebouc, an older castle remodelled by a major campaign of construction work at the start of the 17th century.

See also
Communes of the Gers department

References

Communes of Gers